Los Arcos (English: The Arches) is an amphitheater along the Malecón in Centro, Puerto Vallarta, in the Mexican state of Jalisco.

U.S. News & World Report describes Los Arcos as "another iconic symbol of Puerto Vallarta that plays hosts to free performances, featuring live musicians and traditional Mexican dance troupes, just about every night".

Four decorative stone arches, sometimes called Los Arcos del Malecón (English: Arches of the Malecón), have been described as "almost as worldwide recognizable" as The Boy on the Seahorse.

References

External links

 

Amphitheatres in Mexico
Buildings and structures in Puerto Vallarta
Centro, Puerto Vallarta